Avalon is the sixth extended play (EP) by English singer-songwriter Gabrielle Aplin. It was released on 6 October 2017 through Aplin's record label, Never Fade Records. The title of the EP is a reference to the island of Avalon in the legends surrounding King Arthur. The EP was supported by the lead single, "Waking Up Slow", released on 1 September 2017.

Track listing

References

2017 EPs
Gabrielle Aplin albums